Salehabad (also Romanized as Şāleḩābād) is a village in the Central District of Malard County, Tehran Province, Iran. At the 2006 census, its population was 28, in 12 families.

References 

Populated places in Damavand County